Radio Aamar is a 24-hours private FM radio station in Bangladesh. It broadcasts on 88.4FM (previous frequency 101.6 FM) in Dhaka. It started its official transmission on 11 December 2007. Its programmes include news, Bangla songs, English songs, band songs, weather updates, traffic updates and market prices.

In October 2008, the frequency of the station was changed to 88.4 FM in Dhaka.

Love Guru's Aamar Valobasha
 Every Thursday Night Special Radio Program
 Love Guru 'Ehtesham' as the prime host (2009-2012)
 RJ Tutul & RJ Meghla as co-hosts

Rjs of Radio Aamar
 Rj Iraj Ishtiak
 Rj Shemu
 Rj Fahim Rahman
 Rj Sadman
 Rj Ovi
 Rj Hossain
 Rj Shan
 Rj Rakib
 Rj Fahad
 Rj Sanjana
 Rj Mou
 Rj Daisy
 Rj Arfan
 Rj Ratul
 Rj Rian
 Rj Bishal

External links
 Official Website of Radio Aamar

Radio stations in Bangladesh
Mass media in Dhaka